Athletic training is an allied health care profession recognized by the American Medical Association (AMA) that "encompasses the prevention, examination, diagnosis, treatment, and rehabilitation of emergent, acute, or chronic injuries and medical conditions." 
There are five areas of athletic training listed in the seventh edition (2015) of the Athletic Training Practice Analysis: injury and illness prevention and wellness promotion; examination, assessment, diagnosis; immediate and emergency care; therapeutic intervention; and healthcare administration and professional responsibility.

Athletic trainers (ATs) generally work in places like health clinics, secondary schools, colleges and universities, professional sports programs, and other athletic health care settings, usually operating "under the direction of, or in collaboration with a physician."

Overview 
The percent of ATs in a medical team varies greatly in different settings: secondary schools (24%), colleges and universities (16%), clinics/hospitals (including physician practices) (18%), professional sports and performing arts (3%), industrial/corporate settings (3%), academia (3%), youth sports (1%), military/government/law enforcement (1%), and administration (3%). In all U.S. states except California, practicing athletic trainers are required to have state credentials. According to the National Athletic Trainers' Association, there are more than 58,000 athletic trainers around the world. The U.S. Department of Labor Statistics projects that employment of the athletic trainers is estimated to grow by 19% between 2018 and 2028.

Employment settings 
Athletic trainers work in various settings—from youth sports to collegiate-level sports, the Olympics, or even professional sports. Clinical situations use trainers within sports medicine, cardiac rehab, medical fitness, physical therapy, urgent care facilities, and physician assistants to ensure overall wellness. Performing arts like dance and music use athletic training to enhance athletic performance. Physically enduring jobs such as police, fire departments, and military branches utilize athletic training to support the physical well-being of their people. Athletic trainers focus on work environment efficiency (ergonomics) within manufacturing and industrial workplaces in a more commercial setting.

Roles and responsibilities

Scope 
The Board of Certification serves as the national certifying body for athletic trainers, and its Standards of Professional Practice outline the roles and responsibilities of certified athletic trainers. The standards include expectations such as "The Athletic Trainer renders service or treatment under the direction of a physician". State law determines the setting, limitations, and restrictions on what athletic trainers can and cannot provide.

Referring 
Some patients and clients need treatment or consultation outside of the athletic trainer's expertise. In these cases, the athletic trainer's responsibility is to refer the patient to another healthcare professional. "Several support health services may be used, including school health services, nurses, physicians, dentists, podiatrists, physician's assistants, physical therapists, strength and conditioning specialists, bio-mechanists, exercise physiologists, nutritionists, psychologists, massage therapists, occupational therapists, emergency medical technicians, paramedics, chiropractors, orthopedists, prosthesis, equipment personnel, referees, or social workers."

NATA code of ethics 
"The National Athletic Trainers' Association Code of Ethics states the principles of ethical behavior that should be followed in the practice of athletic training. It is intended to establish and maintain high standards and professionalism for the athletic training profession."

Education

Undergraduate General Studies 
The content of the courses will vary based upon the institute and professor, but there are some general subject matters that any AT should know including human and exercise physiology, kinesiology, anatomy, and nutrition. These subjects are commonly studied to increase knowledge regarding athletic training.

Physiology "is the scientific study of functions and mechanisms in a living system". More in-depth studies of physiology is between human and exercise physiology. Human Physiology is more anatomical structures, exercise physiology is physical exercise conditions and treatments. Kinesiology "identifies stress in our muscles and uses relaxation techniques to release tension and improve our mood, health, and overall well-being" Used in athletic training, focuses more on muscle anatomy and sport focused rehabilitation.  Human anatomy studies the structures on the body including muscular systems, organs, respiratory, bone anatomy, veins, and arteries. This also includes physical examinations of the extremities. Which will include injury recognition, treatment, taping, bracing, and care. After the examination an AT might have to perform acute care of injury. This is implemented when dealing with trauma and illnesses sustained during sport participation. This includes field evaluation of medical emergencies, such as cessation of breathing or circulation, shock, concussion, and spinal injury. After performing care, somewhere down the road athletic trainers may have to provide rehabilitation strategies to go through with the athlete. ATs need to know about basic nutritional principles and concepts that lead to an athlete's personal health, relationship with food and overall optimal health. How a student eats is influential on their recovery time and overall athletic performance.

Undergraduate Athletic Training Programs 
The Commission on Accreditation of Athletic Training Education (CAATE) lists all the accredited programs in the United States.  It provides the college's name, contact information, and a link to the institution's website.

Entry-level Master's Programs 
Although most athletic trainers receive a bachelor's degree in athletic training before taking the Board of Certification Exam (BOC), it is not the only way to receive an education. An entry-level master's program is a two-year program that covers the same material as an undergraduate athletic training degree. Standard prerequisite classes are human anatomy, human physiology, kinesiology, biomechanics, exercise physiology, nutrition, personal health, and a certain number of observation hours completed under a certified athletic trainer (ATC).

Graduate school in athletic training and related fields 
There are 15 schools in the US with an accredited athletic training master's program for those with a bachelor's in athletic training who want to pursue further education. These programs are typically two years in length. While enrolled in one of these programs, the athletic trainer may gain clinical experience and receive a stipend through a graduate assistant internship.

Graduate Assistant Internships 
Typical responsibilities for graduate assistant interns include administering daily medical care to selected intercollegiate athletic teams, evaluating and documenting athletic injuries, completing administrative duties, serving as an approved clinical instructor or clinical instructor in a CAATE-accredited ATEP, and assisting the head athletic trainer. Other internships may include working at a high school or clinic, teaching, or researching. Graduate assistant positions are generally around 10-month appointments that may be renewable after the first year and sometimes include additional summer work.

Accredited Programs 
CAATE evaluates athletic training programs to ensure that they follow the standards for entry-level athletic training programs. Evaluations may take place every three to seven years. Completing the CAATE accredited education program is a part of the criteria that determines a candidate's eligibility for the Board of Certification (BOC) examination.

Organizations 
The National Athletic Trainers Association (NATA) is the professional organization for athletic trainers in the United States. NATA is broken down into 10 geographical districts which each appoint their own agendas and board members. Each district consists of about 3-6 states/territories which have a director that serves on the NATA Board of Directors. Every state has its own state athletic training association that acts similar to the district associations with their own board members. The state associations answer to the district associations and NATA.

Before the formation of NATA, athletic trainers occupied a somewhat insecure place in the athletic program. Since then, considerable professional advancement has been made in the field.

As well as the NATA, there's also the World Federation of Athletic Training & Therapy (WFATT) which began in 1998 but was founded in 2000. The WFATT's mission statement includes "Athletic Training & Therapy will be recognized as an essential part of multidisciplinary healthcare teams worldwide". Across 4 continents, 12 countries and in 42 member associations, there's well over 50,000 athletic trainers registered. To start the WFATT, the US and Canada (Canadian Athletic Therapists Association) went and promoted athletic training in various countries through workshops.

References

External links

 
Sports medicine
Rehabilitation medicine
Physical exercise
Manual therapy
Massage therapy